Ben Bryant (born September 17, 1999) is an American football quarterback for the Cincinnati Bearcats. He previously played for Eastern Michigan.

Early life and high school
Bryant grew up in La Grange, Illinois and attended Lyons Township High School. He was rated a  three-star recruit and initially committed to play college football at Wisconsin. His scholarship offer was eventually pulled, reportedly after tweeting about receiving an offer from another school. Bryant ultimately signed a letter of intent to play Cincinnati.

College career
Bryant played in one game before redshirting his true freshman season. He spent his redshirt freshman season primarily as the backup to starter Desmond Ridder but started the Bearcats' final regular season game against Memphis after Ridder suffered an injury. Bryant finished the season with 29 completions on 51 pass attempts for 388 yards with one touchdown and two interceptions in seven games played. He also spent the 2020 season as Ridder's backup and passed for 90 yards and one touchdown while rushing for 65 yards and one touchdown.

Following the end of the 2020 season, Bryant transferred to Eastern Michigan. He completed 68.4% of his passes for 3,121 yards with 14 touchdowns and seven interceptions. At the end of the season Bryant re-entered the NCAA transfer portal.

Bryant opted to return to Cincinnati for his final season of collegiate eligibility and was eligible to play immediately as a graduate transfer. He was named the starter for the Bearcats' season opener against Arkansas. Bryant started 11 games and passed for 2,732 yards with 21 touchdowns and seven interceptions before suffering a season-ending foot injury.

Statistics

References

External links
Eastern Michigan Eagles bio
Cincinnati Bearcats bio

Living people
Players of American football from Illinois
American football quarterbacks
Cincinnati Bearcats football players
Eastern Michigan Eagles football players
Sportspeople from Cook County, Illinois
Year of birth missing (living people)